is a former Japanese football player and manager. He played for Japan national team.

Club career
Kami was born in Hiroshima Prefecture on June 28, 1941. After graduating from high school, he joined Yawata Steel (later Nippon Steel) in 1960. The club won 1964 Emperor's Cup. In 1965, Yawata Steel joined new league Japan Soccer League. He retired in 1970. He played 85 games and scored 5 goals in the league. He was selected Best Eleven in 1966 and 1967.

National team career
In October 1964, Kami was selected Japan national team for 1964 Summer Olympics in Tokyo. At this competition, on October 16, he debuted against Ghana. He also played as regular player at 1966 Asian Games and 1968 Summer Olympics qualification. However, he was not selected Japan for 1968 Summer Olympics. He played 15 games for Japan until 1968.

Coaching career
After retirement, Kami became a manager for Nippon Steel in 1980 as Teruki Miyamoto successor. However, the club was relegated to Division 2 first time. He resigned in 1983. In 1987, he returned to Nippon Steel and managed until 1989.

National team statistics

Awards
 Japan Soccer League Best Eleven: (2) 1966, 1967

References

External links

 
 Japan National Football Team Database

1941 births
Living people
Association football people from Hiroshima Prefecture
Japanese footballers
Japan international footballers
Japan Soccer League players
Nippon Steel Yawata SC players
Olympic footballers of Japan
Footballers at the 1964 Summer Olympics
Asian Games medalists in football
Asian Games bronze medalists for Japan
Footballers at the 1966 Asian Games
Japanese football managers
Association football defenders
Medalists at the 1966 Asian Games